The Krylov State Research Center is a Russian shipbuilding research and development institute, which operates as a federal state-owned unitary enterprise.

The institute is named after Aleksey Krylov, the Russian naval designer and mathematician who was one of its first superintendents, and is based in Saint Petersburg.

History
The institute was established in 1894, to operate the Russian Empire's first ship model basin—the Naval Administration Towing Tank—on New Holland Island in Saint Petersburg. On 8 March that year, Emperor Alexander III and members of the royal family toured the facility, which is considered the foundation date of the institute. On 3 January 1900, Aleksey Krylov was appointed acting superintendent of the Tank, and proposed the establishment of a broader shipbuilding research institute based around the tank, including laboratories for electrical engineering, and physical, chemical and mechanical testing.

Originally subordinate to the Ministry of Shipbuilding Industry of the Soviet Union, the Krylov Shipbuilding Research Institute (KSRI) worked only for the Soviet Navy, but now operates in all ship science disciplines, and conducts sponsored research for international commercial shipbuilding companies.

See also
Transactions of the Krylov State Research Center

References

External links
 

Research institutes in Saint Petersburg
Federal State Unitary Enterprises of Russia
Shipbuilding companies of Russia
1894 establishments in the Russian Empire
Russian Navy
Shipbuilding companies of the Soviet Union
Companies based in Saint Petersburg
Research institutes in the Soviet Union
Soviet Navy